Esneux is a municipality of Wallonia located in the province of Liège, Belgium. 

On 1 January 2006 Esneux had a total population of 13,072.

The municipality consists of the following districts: Esneux and Tilff. Other villages are Méry and Hony. They are all to be found in the valley of the Ourthe river south of Liège. A railway line links the 4 villages (and then continues further south to Luxembourg).

Although not popular with large numbers of international tourists, Esneux and Tilff do attract people from the local region, due to the local restaurants, the Esneux and Tilff castle, the bee-museum, and several parks.

In Esneux, the largest giant sequoia of Belgium can be found.

See also
 List of protected heritage sites in Esneux
 Été 67, rock band based in Esneux
 Léontine de Maësen, opera singer, born in Esneux in 1835

References

External links
 

 
Municipalities of Liège Province
Segni (tribe)